Year 1356 (MCCCLVI) was a leap year starting on Friday (link will display the full calendar) of the Julian calendar.

Events 
 January–December 
 January 20 – Edward Balliol surrenders his title as King of Scotland, to Edward III of England.
 ca. February – Burnt Candlemas: Edward III of England burns down every town and village in Lothian, Scotland.
 September 19 – Hundred Years' War – Battle of Poitiers: The English, commanded by Edward, the Black Prince, defeat the French, capturing King John II of France.
 October 17 – Erik XII proclaims himself king of Sweden, in opposition to his father, King Magnus IV. Thus begins a civil war in Sweden between father and son, which will last until Erik's death in 1359.
 October 18 (St Luke's Day) – The Basel earthquake affects northern Switzerland, with a maximum MSK intensity of IX–X (Destructive–Devastating), leaving around 1,000 dead.
 December 25 – Charles IV, Holy Roman Emperor, promulgates the Golden Bull, a constitution for his empire.

 Date unknown 
 The Hanseatic League, a trading alliance between many cities in northern Europe, first meets.
 Ghazan II replaces Anushirwan as ruler of the Ilkhanate in Persia.
 Zhu Yuanzhang, one of the leaders in the Red Turban Rebellion, captures the city of Nanjing from the Mongol-led Yuan dynasty in China; from then on it becomes his base of power, and the capital of a new dynasty he will establish in 1368, the Ming dynasty.
 The city of Lwów is granted Magdeburg rights by Casimir III of Poland.
 The majority of the Great Pyramid of Giza's limestone casing stones are removed by Bahri Sultan An-Nasir Nasir-ad-Din al-Hasan, to build fortresses and mosques in the nearby city of Cairo, leaving the first of the Seven Wonders of the Ancient World in the step-stone condition in which it remains into modern times.

Births 
 July 29 – Martin of Aragon (d. 1410)
 date unknown
 Ingegerd Knutsdotter, Swedish abbess (d. 1412)
 Robert IV of Artois, Count of Eu (d. 1387)

Deaths 
 June 23 – Margaret II, Countess of Hainaut (b. 1311)
 September 19 (killed at the Battle of Poitiers):
 Peter I, Duke of Bourbon (b. 1311)
 Walter VI, Count of Brienne, Constable of France (b. 1304)
 date unknown
 Harihara I, founder of the Vijayanagara Empire
 Zheng Yunduan, Chinese poet (b. c. 1327)

References